The Daily Star is a fictional broadsheet newspaper that appeared in Superman stories published by DC Comics. The Daily Star was based in Metropolis and employed Clark Kent, Lois Lane, and Jimmy Olsen; its chief editor is George Taylor both in the Golden Age stories and The New 52 relaunch comics. It was an original precursor of the Daily Planet and was later retconned as its own publishing company in modern comics.

In the comics, the newspaper was located in the heart of Metropolis. The Daily Star building's most distinguishing feature was the enormous star that sat on top of the building.

Fictional history

Superman co-creator Joe Shuster named the Daily Star after the Toronto Daily Star in Ontario, which had been the newspaper that Shuster's parents received and for which Shuster had worked as a paperboy. (Called the Evening Star prior to 1899, the Toronto Daily Star is now known simply as the Toronto Star.)

"I have very fond memories of the Toronto Star," Shuster told Star reporter Henry Mietkiewicz for a story that ran on April 26, 1992, three months before Shuster died in Los Angeles. "I still remember drawing one of the earliest panels that showed the newspaper building. We needed a name, and I spontaneously remembered the Toronto Star. So that's the way I lettered it. I decided to do it that way on the spur of the moment, because the Star was such a great influence on my life."

Golden Age
When Superman first appeared in comics, in June 1938's Action Comics #1, his alter ego, Clark Kent, worked for the "large metropolitan daily" newspaper (Action #7, Dec 1938) the Daily Star under editor George Taylor (Superman #2, Fall 1939). With the exception of Action Comics #2, when Kent (and Taylor) inexplicably worked for the Cleveland Evening News, the above arrangement remained unchanged through March 1940 (Action #22).

Kent apparently had persuaded Taylor to hire him only shortly before the first issue of Action by phoning in an exclusive account of Superman's first public act—thwarting an attempted lynching at the county jail (Superman #1, Summer 1939). Before long, Kent was referred to as the paper's "ace scribe" (Action #9, Feb 1939) and "ace reporter" (Action #6, Nov 1938). He often butted heads with Lois Lane, an aggressive, career-minded journalist who'd started as the Daily Star'''s "sob sister" (Action #7, Dec 1938) and "lovelorn editor" before earning her stripes as a full-fledged "news reporter" (Superman #3, Winter 1940) and war correspondent in Europe (Action #22, Mar 1940).

Then, in Spring 1940 (Action #23), without any in-story explanation, the newspaper suddenly was referred to as the Daily Planet, an especially amusing development for Kent and Lane, who were abroad and in the midst of a multi-issue storyline when their place of employment changed names (the alteration had been made earlier in the newspaper comic strip, with Nov 13, 1939's #259). In reality, the fictional newspaper's name was changed to avoid a name conflict with actual papers that had "Star" in their titles. In the monthly comic titled, Superman, the newspaper was the Daily Star until it was changed, also without fanfare, to the Daily Planet in Superman #4 (Spring 1940).

George Taylor remained the editor (Action #25, June '40) through November 1940 (Action #30), after which new Daily Planet editor Perry White inexplicably appeared (Superman #7, November–December 1940). Kent and Lane made no reference to the management change, though they clearly were not as enamored of White as they'd been of Taylor.

Silver and Bronze Ages
When DC Comics made use of its multiverse means of continuity tracking between the early 1960s and mid-1980s, it was declared that the Daily Star—edited by George Taylor—was the workplace of the Golden Age or "Earth-Two" Clark Kent, Lois Lane and office boy-turned-cub reporter Jimmy Olsen, while the Daily Planet—edited by Perry White—was unique to their Silver Age or "Earth-One" counterparts.

In the Silver Age continuity, Perry White was promoted to editor-in-chief upon the retirement of the Earth-One version of George Taylor (this took place while Clark Kent was in college). The Perry White of Earth-Two, however, was a lead reporter for the Daily Star and "filled in" as editor from time to time when Taylor was away.

Clark Kent of Earth-2 advanced his reporting career to become Lead Investigative Reporter for the Daily Star. But, always mindful of his dual persona, he largely maintained a retiring manner. In the meantime, Kent (and Superman) befriended Jimmy Olsen, who'd started as a pre-teen office boy at the Daily Star in the 1930s but became a cub reporter when he published the story of Superman's defeat of the Archer (Superman #13).

In the late 1940s, would-be crime lord Colonel Future challenged the Wizard, a rumored sorcerer, to eliminate the Man of Steel. The Wizard cast a spell to rid the world of Superman, but merely made Clark repress the memory of his alter ego. As a result, Kent became an aggressive, crusading reporter who won the heart—and hand—of Lois Lane. But when she discovered Clark's secret on their honeymoon, Lois tracked down the Wizard and made him reverse the spell. (Action Comics #484.)

George Taylor retired in the early 1950s, and Kent was selected over Perry White as the new Editor-in-Chief of the Daily Star. Lois Lane-Kent was promoted to Lead Investigative Reporter while James Olsen became a managing editor.

When, in the mid-1980s, the multiverse collapsed into a single new universe (Crisis on Infinite Earths #10), the history and most of the people of Earth-2 were wiped from existence. However, Lois Lane-Kent was saved from the universal reboot and went with her husband to live in a pocket dimension (Crisis on Infinite Earths #12).

Modern Age
In the post-Crisis universe, the Daily Star is occasionally mentioned, suggesting it is a separate newspaper.

For nearly twenty years, Superman was content in the "paradise" dimension until Lois fell ill (Infinite Crisis Secret Files 2006). Believing that seeing home would revitalize her, Superman built a replica of the Daily Star building. This failed to help, however. When Lois finally died, she told her husband that she was happy to have lived such a long life.

In week 38 of 52, it is implied that the Star is owned by Lex Luthor, or at the very least, is highly sympathetic to him, and skeptical of metahumans.

The New 52

In September 2011, The New 52 rebooted DC's continuity. In this new timeline, Action Comics runs stories set five years in the past, where Clark works for the Daily Star under Taylor, while Lois and Jimmy work for Stars competitor, The Daily Planet. In the re-launched Superman comic, set in present day, Clark has joined the staff of the Daily Planet with Jimmy and Lois.

ReferencesDaily Star. The DC Database Project. 6 February 2008.Daily Star. Supermanica.
"George Taylor". Supermanica.
"Kal-L (Earth-Two)". The DC Database Project. 30 August 2008.
"Lois Lane (Earth-Two)". The DC Database Project. 24 July 2008.
"Superman". 
"Superman of Earth-2". Supermanica.
"Superman at the Star". The Toronto Star'', April 26, 1992.

1938 in comics
Fictional elements introduced in 1938
Metropolis (comics)